Annie Toinon (17 August 1875 – 28 February 1967) was a French stage and film actress. She often worked with the writer-director Marcel Pagnol.

Selected filmography
 Fanny (1932)
 Rocambole (1932)
 Jofroi (1934)
 Angèle (1934)
 Merlusse (1935)
 The Gardens of Murcia (1936)
 L'Arlésienne (1942)

References

Bibliography 
 Crisp, Colin. French Cinema—A Critical Filmography: Volume 1, 1929-1939. Indiana University Press, 2015.

External links 
 

1875 births
1967 deaths
Actresses from Marseille
French film actresses
French stage actresses